The third series of the Australian cooking game show MasterChef Australia premiered on Sunday, 1 May 2011 at 7:30 pm on Network Ten. Judges George Calombaris, Gary Mehigan and Matt Preston returned from the previous series and were joined by Matt Moran. The third series was won by Kate Bracks who defeated Michael Weldon in the grand finale on 7 August 2011. The second part of the series' final (episode 85, "The Winner Announced"), attracted an audience of 2.74 million viewers, making it the third most viewed episode of any Australian television series of 2011, only beaten by the final episodes of The Block (3.09 million) and Australia's Got Talent (2.98 million).

Changes
The third series of MasterChef Australia brought some changes to the format of the show. Joining the judging panel as a regular guest was chef Matt Moran.
A twist used in past series of the show to bring back eliminated contestants for a second chance was dropped for series 3.

While the weekly routine was mostly unchanged, there were some small differences in series 3.

Sunday night's challenge was not restricted to a Mystery Box Challenge and an Invention Test, with Team and Offsite Challenges also used.

The Tuesday night challenge was modified: now known as an immunity challenge rather than a celebrity chef challenge; the standing of the opponent varied, with anyone from a contestant to an apprentice or a well-known chef appearing. The rules varied slightly from week to week, but typically the contestant(s) were given a recipe and a time advantage but neither competitor had knowledge of what they were about to cook until just before the challenge started.

Eliminations on Thursdays were no longer decided by taste tests; final challenges were based on cooking.

Contestants

Opening Week
The opening week of MasterChef Australia saw 50 contestants competing for the 24 positions in the main competition. Twenty-six were eliminated:

Top 24
The full Top 24 were revealed on Sunday, 8 May. At the first Top 24 challenge, it was revealed that Paul had quit the competition due to work commitments and Alex, who had been eliminated in the Top 50 portion, was entered as his replacement.

Future appearances

 In Series 4 Kate Bracks appeared as a guest judge for a Mystery Box Challenge.
 Kate appeared on a Special All Star series for charity along with Kumar Pereira, Hayden Quinn and Dani Venn. Kumar came 12th, Hayden came 10th, Dani came 6th and Kate came 3rd.
 In Series 6 Kate appeared as a guest judge for both the Mystery Box and Invention Test Challenge.
 In a superstar themed week in Series 7 Hayden appeared as a guest judge for an Invention Test challenge.
 Kate appeared at the Auditions for Series 10 to support the Top 50.
 Dani and Hayden appeared on Series 12. Dani was eliminated on 3 May 2020, finishing 20th and Hayden was eliminated on 17 May 2020, finishing 15th. Michael Weldon also appeared in 'Twist Week' for a Masterclass Lesson.
 In Series 14 Michael appeared for another chance to win the title. Michael was eliminated on 12 June 2022, finishing 11th.

Guests
 Adriano Zumbo – Series Premiere: Top 50: Part 1, Pressure Test 10
 Maggie Beer – Top 50: Part 2, MasterClass 1, Pressure Test 9
 Justin North – Immunity Challenge 1, MasterClass 2, MasterClass 9
 Alessandro Pavoni – Immunity Challenge 1, MasterClass 2, Immunity Challenge 9
 Alex Keene – Immunity Challenge 1, Immunity Challenge 9
 Andrew Connole – Offsite Challenge 1
 Jean-Luc Rocha – Elimination Challenge 1
 Abla Amad – Elimination Challenge 1
 Shaun Presland – Elimination Challenge 1, MasterClass 14
 Andrew McConnell – Immunity Challenge 2
 Colin Fassnidge – Immunity Challenge 2, MasterClass 3, Worst Nightmare Challenge
 Jonathan Barthelmess – Elimination Challenge 2
 Leanne Beck – MasterClass 3
 Mark Jensen – Immunity Challenge 3
 Adam D'Sylva – Immunity Challenge 3
 Reuben Radonich – Elimination Challenge 3
 Romeo Baudouin – MasterClass 4
 Donna Hay – MasterClass 4
 Jake Drachenberg – W.A. Invention Test
 Hadleigh Troy – Immunity Challenge 4
 Tony Howell – Immunity Challenge 4
 Stefano Manfredi – Elimination Challenge 4
 Frank Shek – MasterClass 5
 Dan Hong – Pressure Test 3
 Martin Boetz – Immunity Challenge 5
 Thorsten Schmidt – Immunity Challenge 5
 Nigella Lawson – Offsite Challenge 4
 Tetsuya Wakuda – Elimination Challenge 5
 Elena Arzak – Elimination Challenge 5
 Miguel Maestre – MasterClass 6
 Rick Stein – MasterClass 6
 Chef Wan – MasterClass 6
 Neil Perry – QANTAS Fine Dining Challenge, QANTAS First Lounge Challenge
 Thomas Keller – QANTAS Fine Dining Challenge
 Andoni Aduriz – QANTAS Fine Dining Challenge
 Heston Blumenthal – Pressure Test 4
 Darren Purchese – Immunity Challenge 6
 Matt Stone – Offsite Challenge 5
 James Privett – MasterClass 7
 David Chang – Sunday Challenge 6, Ultimate Dinner Party Challenge
 Mary Calombaris – Pressure Test 5, MasterClass 8
 Jeremy Strode – Immunity Challenge 7
 Vincent Gadan – Immunity Challenge 7, MasterClass 8
 Shane Osborn – Elimination Challenge 7
 Christine Manfield – MasterClass 8, Immunity Challenge 8
 Jim Moran – Sunday Challenge 7
 Matthew Kemp – Pressure Test 6
 Merle Parrish – Immunity Challenge 8
 Dietmar Sawyere – Elimination Challenge 8
 Fleur Sullivan – MasterClass 9
 Al Brown – MasterClass 9
 Simon Gault – MasterClass 9
 Martin Bosley – MasterClass 9
 Shane Delia – Sunday Challenge 8
 Armando Percuoco – Immunity Challenge 9
 Marco Pierre White – Offsite Challenge 8
 Anthony Bourdain – Elimination Challenge 9, Sunday Challenge 9
 Andre Ursini – Masterclass 10
 Jimmy Seervai – Masterclass 10
 Luke Nguyen – Masterclass 10
 Alvin Quah – Masterclass 10
 Eric Ripert – Sunday Challenge 9
 Armando Monterroso – United Nations Challenge
 Lidia Bastianich – Immunity Challenge 10
 Cesare Casella – Immunity Challenge 10
 Jon Bignelli – Ultimate Dinner Party Challenge
 Paul Liebrandt – Ultimate Dinner Party Challenge
 Kenneth Woods – Elimination Challenge 10
 Tren'ness Woods-Black – Elimination Challenge 10
 Sylvia Woods – Elimination Challenge 10
 Daniel Boulud – MasterClass 11
 Sandy Levine – MasterClass 11
 Steve Evetts – MasterClass 11
 Kylie Kwong – Sunday Challenge 10
 14th Dalai Lama – Sunday Challenge 10
 Tim Costello – Sunday Challenge 10
 Shanaka Fernando – Sunday Challenge 10
 Bill Crews – Sunday Challenge 10
 Ronnie Khan – Sunday Challenge 10
 Katrina Kanetani – Pressure Test 8
 Philippa Sibley – Immunity Challenge 11
 Eamon Sullivan – Immunity Challenge 11
 Alan Joyce – QANTAS First Lounge Challenge
 Ben Milgate – MasterClass 12
 Elvis Abrahanowicz – MasterClass 12
 Mark Olive – MasterClass 12
 Shannon Bennett – Immunity Challenge 12, MasterClass 14
 Teage Ezard – Immunity Challenge 12
 Donovan Cook – Worst Nightmare Challenge
 Ashly Hicks – Worst Nightmare Challenge
 Anthea Leonard – MasterClass 13
 Curtis Stone – Sunday Challenge 12
 Mark Best – Three Hat Challenge
 Peter Doyle – Three Hat Challenge
 Peter Gilmore – Three Hat Challenge
 Martin Benn – MasterClass 14
 René Redzepi – Grand Finale

Elimination chart

  In Week 1, the judges selected the twenty-four finalists from the Top 50.
  In Week 2, prior to the first Top 24 challenge, it was revealed that Paul had withdrawn from the competition citing work commitments. His place was taken by Alex. Also, instead of the traditional Sunday Challenge, contestants were asked to cook the dish that "changed their life". There was no Bottom 3 for this challenge.
  In Weeks 3 and 7, the entire losing team went through to the Elimination Challenge, where they competed in three rounds, until two remained for the final round.
  In Week 4, the Sunday Challenge featured contestants working in groups of three. The entire winning team went into the Immunity Challenge.
  In Weeks 4, 9 and 12 the entire losing team went through to the Elimination Challenge, from which the bottom performers were selected.
  In Week 5 (Western Australia Week), the Sunday Challenge was a Team Challenge. The losing team did not face elimination.
  In Week 5, the winners of the Team Challenge competed for a spot in the Immunity Challenge. The winner also received immunity for the next Elimination Challenge.
  In Week 5, Wednesday's challenge was an individual cooking challenge. The Bottom 2 went into an Elimination Challenge, and the Top 2 received a special reward and MasterClass.
  In Week 7, the Sunday Challenge featured contestants working in pairs. The winning pair decided amongst themselves who would contest the Immunity Challenge, while the two worst performing teams went into an Elimination Challenge.
  In Week 8s Mystery Box Challenge, Ellie was unwell and was pulled to the Pressure Test. In week 8s Pressure Test, Adam was not the weakest competitor but chose to withdraw from the competition.
  In Week 8, the entire losing team went through to the Elimination Challenge, where they competed in two preliminary rounds. The weakest performer from each preliminary round was sent to the final cook-off.
  In Week 9, the entire losing team went through to the Elimination Challenge, where the Bottom two were selected. Hayden used his immunity pin and did not to take part in the Elimination.
  In Week 10, the Sunday Challenge featured a Mystery Box challenge and Invention Test. Kate won the Mystery Box challenge, while Dani won the Invention Test. Prior to the Offsite Challenge, Mat was removed from the competition for using a smartphone, his place taken by last eliminated contestant Billy.
  In Week 10, the entire losing team went through to the Elimination Challenge, where they competed in three rounds, until two remained for the final round. Dani used her immunity pin and did not to take part in the Elimination. The Top 2 from the winning team then got a reward (flying business class to New York City).
  In Week 11, the Sunday Challenge was the first in a week in New York. The loser of the challenge went into lockdown for an elimination challenge later in the week.
  In Week 11, instead of a Pressure Test contestants competed to win the chance to take part in the Celebrity Chef Challenge. Ellie won the challenge. The loser of the challenge went into lockdown for an elimination challenge later in the week.
  In Week 11, the New York team challenge featured three teams of two.
  In Week 12s Pressure Test, Ellie used her immunity pin and did not to take part in the Pressure Test.
  In Semi-Finals Week and Finals Week, there was no bottom for the Sunday Challenge.
  In Semi-Finals Week, instead of a Pressure Test the Top 5 cooked a meal for their families. There was no bottom for this challenge.
  In Semi-Finals Week, despite not being in the Bottom 2, Alana was pulled into the Elimination Challenge when Dani used her Immunity pin.
  In Finals Week's Pressure Test, no contestant reproduced a dish of sufficient quality, placing them all in an Elimination Challenge.

Episodes and Ratings

References

Further reading

2011 Australian television seasons
MasterChef Australia
Television shows filmed in New York City